Steven Lawther is the author of 'Unthinkable - Raith Rovers' improbable journey from the bottom of the top of Scottish football' published by Pitch Publishing in 2014. The book tells the story of Raith Rovers 1994 League Cup win and was listed on The Scotsman's best Scottish sport reads of 2014. His second book, 'Arrival - How Scotland's women took their place on the world stage and inspired a generation' was published by Pitch Publishing in 2021 and documents the history of the Scotland National Women's Team and their journey to the 2019 World Cup.

Lawther is a former Head of Communications for the Scottish Labour Party. He came to prominence when he resigned from his post three months before the Scottish Parliament election campaign in 2007. Labour went on to lose the election to the Scottish National Party. Lawther also conducted opinion polling for the Office of the First Minister and Deputy First Minister of Northern Ireland in relation to the devolution of policing and justice powers in 2010.

He now works in the private sector.

References 
 http://news.scotsman.com/ViewArticle.aspx?articleid=3357229
 http://news.bbc.co.uk/1/hi/scotland/6394967.stm
 http://www.thedrum.co.uk/news/2007/09/14/3568-new-agency-launched-by-former-labour-comms-boss
 http://www.timesonline.co.uk/tol/news/uk/scotland/article722977.ece

Scottish political consultants
Living people
Year of birth missing (living people)